Jesús Cruz (born April 15, 1995) is a Mexican professional baseball pitcher in the Philadelphia Phillies organization. He has played in Major League Baseball (MLB) for the St. Louis Cardinals and Atlanta Braves.

Career

Sultanes de Monterrey
Cruz began his professional career by signing with the Sultanes de Monterrey of the Mexican League on March 30, 2017. Cruz struggled to an 8.49 ERA in 13 appearances for Monterrey before he was released on July 1.

St. Louis Cardinals
On July 2, 2017, Cruz signed a minor league contract with the St. Louis Cardinals organization. He finished the 2017 season splitting time between three Cardinals affiliates; the Dominican Summer League Cardinals, the rookie-level GCL Cardinals, and the Low-A State College Spikes. With the three clubs, Cruz worked to a 1.42 ERA with 30 strikeouts in 19.0 innings pitched across 15 combined appearances. In 2018, Cruz split the season between the Single-A Peoria Chiefs and the High-A Palm Beach Cardinals, pitching to a 7–1 record and 3.27 ERA with 104 strikeouts in 30 total games. He spent the 2019 season split between the Double-A Springfield Cardinals and the Triple-A Memphis Redbirds, but struggled overall to the tune of a 6.02 ERA with 89 strikeouts, a 13.1 K/9 and 6.8 BB/9 in 52 contests between the two affiliates. Cruz did not play in a minor league game in 2020 due to the cancellation of the minor league season because of the COVID-19 pandemic.

Cruz was selected to the 40-man roster and promoted to the major leagues for the first time on August 18, 2020, and same day he made his MLB debut. He made his major league debut that day against the Chicago Cubs, allowing two earned runs in an inning of relief. He was optioned down to the alternate training site following the appearance. On September 1, Cruz was designated for assignment by the Cardinals after Ryan Helsley was activated off of the COVID list. Cruz spent the 2021 season with Triple-A Memphis, posting a 3.06 ERA with 38 strikeouts across 37 appearances. In the offseason, Cruz played with the Águilas de Mexicali of the Mexican Pacific League. On March 30, 2022, Cruz was released by the Cardinals organization.

Atlanta Braves
On April 6, 2022, Cruz signed a minor league deal with the Atlanta Braves. He was assigned to the Triple-A Gwinnett Braves to begin the year. Cruz was recalled to the major leagues on May 29. He was sent outright on August 6, 2022. On October 14, Cruz elected to become a free agent.

Philadelphia Phillies
On January 24, 2023, Cruz signed a minor league contract with the Philadelphia Phillies organization.

References

External links

1995 births
Living people
Águilas de Mexicali players
Atlanta Braves players
Baseball players from San Luis Potosí
Charros de Jalisco players
Dominican Summer League Cardinals players
Mexican expatriate baseball players in the Dominican Republic
Gulf Coast Cardinals players
Gwinnett Stripers players
Major League Baseball pitchers
Major League Baseball players from Mexico
Memphis Redbirds players
Mexican expatriate baseball players in the United States
Mexican League baseball pitchers
Palm Beach Cardinals players
Peoria Chiefs players
Springfield Cardinals players
St. Louis Cardinals players
State College Spikes players
Sultanes de Monterrey players
2023 World Baseball Classic players